Wollondilly Shire is a periurban local government area, located on the south west fringe of the Greater Sydney area in New South Wales, Australia, parts of which fall into the Macarthur, Blue Mountains and Central Tablelands regions in the state of New South Wales, Australia. Wollondilly is seen as the transition between Regional NSW and the Greater Sydney Region, and is variously categorised as part of both. Wollondilly Shire was created by proclamation in the NSW Government Gazette on 7 March 1906, following the passing of the Local Government (Shires) Act 1905, and amalgamated with the Municipality of Picton on 1 May 1940.

Wollondilly Shire is named after the Wollondilly River. The area is traversed by the Hume Highway and the Southern Highlands railway line. Wollondilly Shire contains several small towns and villages broken up by farms and sandstone gorges. To its west is wilderness and includes the Nattai Wilderness and the Burragorang Valley. The majority of the Shire is either national park or forms part of the water catchment for Sydney's water supply. The Shire provides 97% of Sydney's water supply.

The Mayor of Wollondilly Shire is Cr. Matt Gould, an independent politician.

Towns, villages and localities 
Towns, villages and localities in the Wollondilly Shire are:

Council history
Wollondilly Shire was constituted by proclamation in the NSW Government Gazette on 7 March 1906, following the passing of the Local Government (Shires) Act 1905 (Shire No. 122 of 134), and included a wide area bounded by the local government areas of Camden, Campbelltown and Picton and Nepean Shire. A temporary council of five members was appointed on 16 May 1906, which comprised: Richard Henry Antill of Jarvisfield, Picton, Thomas Donohue of Burragorang, George Frederick Litchfield of Yerranderie, George Macarthur-Onslow of Camden Park, Menangle, and John Simpson of Macquarie Dale, Appin. The council first met on 15 June 1906, electing Macarthur-Onslow as Chairman of the Temporary Council and C. A. Thompson as secretary and shire clerk. A. P. Minton, was later appointed Shire Clerk in June 1907.

The first elections for the council were held on 24 November 1906 for six councillors in three ridings of two councillors each: A Riding, B Riding and C Riding:

The final meeting of the Temporary Council and the first meeting of the elected Council was held on 3 December 1906 at The Oaks, at which the chairman of the Temporary Council, George Macarthur-Onslow was elected at the first Shire President of Wollondilly. However, on 11 January 1907, Macarthur-Onslow resigned as president, citing the distance between the shire offices and his home at Camden Park, and John E. Moore was elected Shire President in his place. On 13 February 1908, James O. Moore was elected as Shire President, and re-elected to a second term in February 1909. Following the resignation of James O. Moore in June 1909, Alfred Leonard Bennett was elected Shire President of the on 8 June 1909.

On 31 May 1911 part of the Blue Mountains Shire was transferred to the Wollondilly Shire and part of Wollondilly Shire was transferred to the Nepean Shire from 21 March 1940.

Amalgamation with Picton
When created in 1906, Wollondilly did not include the township of Picton, which had already been incorporated as the Borough of Picton on 15 March 1895. The Borough of Picton became the Municipality of Picton on 31 December 1906 with the passing of the Local Government Extension Act, 1906.

The Picton Municipal Council held a voluntary poll on 1 April 1939, at the request of residents, on the question of the union of the Picton Municipality and the Wollondilly Shire. The poll was resolved in the affirmative, with 197 for and 178 against. The proposal for a "Picton Shire" was subsequently gazetted on 25 August 1939 and on 20 November 1939 the Department of Works and Local Government held an inquiry in Picton on the various issues relating to amalgamation.

From 1 May 1940 the Municipality of Picton was amalgamated into Wollondilly Shire and the Shire Council was then expanded to consist of eight councillors representing four ridings. The first Provisional Council comprised: George John Adams and Edgar Henry Kirk Downes for A Riding; Eric Moore and Septimus Ernest Prosser for B Riding; James Thomas Carroll and Edward Wonson for C Riding' and John Bradburn Cartwright and Roy Carrington Pearce for D Riding. The council seat was subsequently moved from The Oaks to Picton.

Demographics
Aboriginal and Torres Strait Islander people made up 2.4% of the population which is on par with the national average. The median age of people in the Wollondilly Shire was 36 years. Children aged 0–14 years made up 23.1% of the population and people aged 65 years and over made up 10.8% of the population. Of people in the area aged 15 years and over, 54.9% were married and 10.4% were either divorced or separated.

Population growth in the Wollondilly Shire between the 2001 Census and the 2006 Census was 9.18%; and in the subsequent five years to the 2011 Census, population growth was 7.23%. This was higher than the population growth for Australia from 2001 to 2006 (5.78%) but less than the national figure for 2006 to 2011 (8.32%). The median weekly income for residents within the Wollondilly Shire was marginally higher than the national average.

At the 2011 Census, the proportion of residents in the Wollondilly local government area who stated their ancestry as Australian or Anglo-Saxon was more than 63% (national average was 65.2%). More than 69% of Wollondilly Shire residents nominated a religious affiliation of Christianity at the 2011 Census, which was well above the national average of 50.2%. Compared to the national average, there was a lower than average proportion of households in the Wollondilly local government area (8.3%) where two or more languages were spoken (national average was 20.4%), and a significantly higher proportion (91.2%) where English only was spoken at home (national average was 76.8%).

Council

Current composition and election method
Wollondilly Shire Council is composed of nine councillors elected proportionally as two wards, each electing 4 councillors as well as a popularly elected mayor who is elected at large. All councillors are elected for a fixed four-year term of office.

The current council was elected in December 2021, with the current Mayor Matt Gould being the first popularly elected mayor in the history of the shire. Prior to this the mayor was elected by the councillors for a period of 2 years. The Mayor and Councillors are also allocated one or more portfolios that they have strategic oversight of. The current members of the council are:

Shire Presidents and Mayors

Heritage listings
The Wollondilly Shire has a number of heritage-listed sites, including:
 Appin, Cataract Road: Cataract Dam
 Appin, Wilton Road: Windmill Hill, Appin
 Bargo, Avon Dam Road: Nepean Dam
 Bargo, Hume Highway: Wirrimbirra Sanctuary
 Bargo, Main Southern railway 96.265 km: Bargo railway viaduct
 Camden Park, Elizabeth Macarthur Avenue: Camden Park Estate
 Cordeaux, Cordeaux River: Cordeaux Dam
 Couridjah, Main Southern railway: Couridjah railway station
 Menangle, Main Southern railway: Menangle railway station
 Menangle, Main Southern railway: Nepean River railway bridge, Menangle
 Orangeville, Brownlow Hill Loop Road: Brownlow Hill Estate
 Picton, Hume Highway Deviation: Jarvisfield
 Picton, Main Southern railway: Picton railway station
 Picton, Main Southern railway: Stonequarry Creek railway viaduct, Picton
 Picton, Oaks Road: Abbotsford
 Picton, Prince Street: Victoria Bridge, Picton
 Tahmoor, Main Southern railway: Tahmoor railway station
 Thirlmere, NSW Rail Transport Museum, Barbour Road: Rail Paybus FP1
 Warragamba, Coxs River Arms: Coxs River track
 Warragamba, Warragamba Dam: Megarritys Bridge
 Warragamba, Warragamba Dam: Warragamba Dam - Haviland Park
 Warragamba, Warragamba Dam: Warragamba Dam Emergency Scheme
 Wilton, Wilton Park Road: Wilton Park

Local media
Wollondilly is home to two local newspapers, the District Reporter and the Wollondilly Express. Other regional media which serve the area are radio stations, 2MCR and C91.3FM,and the "Macarthur Chronicle" a regional newspaper covering the wider Macarthur Region.

References

External links

Wollondilly Shire Council

 
Local government areas of New South Wales
1906 establishments in Australia
Hume Highway
Georges River
Wollondilly